Al-Hit-Touch/Balu Basti is a village in the Nicobar district of Andaman and Nicobar Islands, India. It is located in the Nancowry tehsil.

Demographics 

The village was affected by the 2004 Indian Ocean earthquake and tsunami. According to the 2011 census of India, Al-Hit-Touch/Balu Basti has 22 households. The effective literacy rate (i.e. the literacy rate of population excluding children aged 6 and below) is 94.37%.

References 

Villages in Nancowry tehsil